Naddodd (  or  ;  ; ; fl. c. 9th century) was a Norse Viking who is credited with the discovery of Iceland.

Biography
Naddodd was born in Agder in what is today southern Norway. He was one of the earliest settlers on the Faroe Islands after Grímur Kamban became the first to settle there around 825.

Landnámabók, a medieval Icelandic manuscript, describes in considerable detail the settlement of Iceland (Icelandic: landnám) by the Norse in the 9th and 10th century. According to Landnámabók, Iceland was discovered by Naddodd, who was sailing from Norway to the Faroe Islands, but got lost and drifted to the east coast of Iceland. Naddodd came upon the shore of a land with a bay and mountains near what is today the Icelandic town of Reyðarfjörður.

Although he climbed a mountain to look for smoke rising from fireplaces, he saw no sign of human activity. Naddodd decided to continue his journey to the Faroe Islands, but as he returned to his boat, it started to snow, so he named the land Snowland (Snæland). The island was later known as Iceland (Ísland) following the settlement of Hrafna-Flóki Vilgerðarson.

Naddodd was the probable father of Ann Naddodsdóttir from Shetland. Naddodd has distant relations to Erik the Red and his son, Leif Erikson.

See also
 Ingólfr Arnarson
 Settlement of Iceland

References

Further reading
 John Haywood (2016). Northmen: The Viking Saga, AD 793–1241. Macmillan. .
  .
 Byock, Jesse (1988). Medieval Iceland: Society, Sagas and Power. University of California Press. .

External links
History of Iceland

9th-century Faroese people
9th-century Icelandic people
Norwegian explorers
9th-century Vikings
9th-century explorers